Charles Wilson (February 5, 1841 – March 1, 1924) was an English-born lawyer and political figure in British Columbia. He represented Cariboo from 1882 to 1886 as an Independent member and Vancouver City from 1903 to 1906 as a Conservative in the Legislative Assembly of British Columbia.

He was born in London and was educated in England. Wilson came to Victoria in 1862 and worked for some time in the gold fields in the Cariboo and Big Bend areas. He later studied law and was called to the British Columbia bar in 1883. Wilson served as counsel for the Bank of Montreal. He was defeated when he ran for reelection to the assembly in 1886. Wilson was elected the first president of the British Columbia Conservative Party in 1899. He ran unsuccessfully for an assembly seat for Victoria City in 1890 and for Vancouver City in 1900. Wilson served in the provincial executive council as president and as Attorney General.

He was married three times: to Minnie Parker in 1876, to Helen Mary Twiford in 1894 and to Maude Hamilton McLean in 1909. Wilson died in Vancouver at the age of 83.

References 

1841 births
1924 deaths
Independent MLAs in British Columbia
British Columbia Conservative Party MLAs
British Columbia Conservative Party leaders
Attorneys General of British Columbia
English emigrants to pre-Confederation British Columbia